, also known as Crayon Shin-chan: Roar! Kasukabe Wild Kingdom is a 2009 anime film. It is the 17th film based on the popular comedy manga and anime series Crayon Shin-chan. The film was released to theatres on April 18, 2009 in Japan.

Plot 
Mamoru Shizime, the new mayor of Kasukabe city starts ecology activities 
Shinnosuke picks a mysterious small bottle containing light green liquid while cleaning the riverbank and takes it home. That night, Hiroshi and Misae drink that mistakenly. Then they gradually begin to transform into animals. Hiroshi gets transformed into a rooster and Misae gets transformed into a leopardess. When Shinnosuke's friends visit them, a mysterious group led by a man named Bunbetsu suddenly appears and try to capture them but fails. They manage to escape and gets help from a woman named Victoria, but eventually get caught because Hiroshi, who got turn into a rooster went to a falseful direction where it leads to Bunbetsu's Corn Trap. They are brought in front of Mamoru Shizime who is actually the leader of the "Save Keeping Beautiful Earth" (SKBE), and is executing the "Human Animalization Plan", a plan to stop environmental destruction by turning humans into animals. The drink that even Hiroshi and Misae drank was the "Human Animalization drink" that he developed for the plan and turned humans into animals. And a human who once drinks that and becomes an animal, all the memories of being a human being will erased forever.

Shinnosuke his friends (Kasukabe Defence Force), Himawari and Victoria escapes but
his parents are taken away through an airship. Shinnosuke with Victoria reaches to his home. Victoria leaves from there to the headquarters of SKBE. Shinnosuke also prepares for leaving just before his friends come to his house transformed into a bat, penguin, rabbit, and pangolin (but only remained their human heads) due to drinking the partially prepared animalization drink. They leave from there.

They notice Bunbetsu and follow him, they reach to an untouched forest spreads out in the underground cavity of Kasukabe, and there was a base in the center of it. They uses the power of animals to overcome the henchmen, but get caught due to Shinnosuke. Shinnosuke confronts his parents who have become completely animals.

Shinnosuke gets hurt by Misae who became a leopardess. Misae regains her memory and escaped from the room and released the Kasukabe Defense Force being forced to generate human power. The Nohara family defeats SKBE executive Maihashi, and the defense team uses the power of animals to gain an advantage. Victoria sneaks in and is captured first, but wakes up and destroys the base. Hiroshi finally regain their memories when the drainage facilities gets destroyed and they reach to Kasukabe railway station.

However, all humans of Kasukabe city is transformed into animals as Mamoru is still executing his plan. A monument emerges from the basement and the final battle between Mamoru and the Noharas begins. Shizime transforms into a Chimera with a special drink named DX and hunts down the Nohara family Shinnosuke also transforms into an elephant but dite to being small he fails to fight. At that time Himawari who became a polar bear comes to help and the situation reverses. Then Victoria comes and reveals her identity to be Yoshiko Shizime, wife of Mamoru. The reason why Mamoru made a radical plan was not only the despair of human beings who do not care about nature, but also the fact that Yoshiko didn't care of nature. Yoshiko decides tries to drink an animalization drink, but Mamoru smash the bottle into pieces to his love towards his wife. He leaves good mission and apologize. The four Shizime couples have reconciled, all the animalized humans have returned to their original state, Hiroshi is more environmentally conscious than ever, and the usual daily life has returned.

Cast 
 Akiko Yajima as Shinnosuke Nohara
 Miki Narahashi as Misae Nohara
 Keiji Fujiwara as Hiroshi Nohara
 Satomi Kōrogi as Himawari Nohara
 Mari Mashiba as Toru Kazama and Shiro
 Tamao Hayashi as Nene Sakurada
 Teiyū Ichiryūsai aa Masao Sato
 Chie Satō as Bo Suzuki
 Yūko Gotō as Yushiko Shizime aka Victoria
 Takahiro Yamamoto as Bunbetsu
 Ai Orikasa as Maihashi
 Kōichi Yamadera as Mamoru Shizime
 Jero as himself

Characters

Mamoru Shizen 
The new mayor of Kasukabe city. He is the leader of the radical environmental conservation organization "Save Keeping Beautiful Earth (SKBE). In order to curb the environmental destruction they invented the "Human Animalization drink." Originally he began to environmental conservation activities for his wife was not interested in those, but that had been developed to form a tissue environmental conservation extreme that it eventually was the reason for the formation SKBE. Finally settled with Yoshiko, he leaved turning humans into animals.

Victoria 
Her real name is Yoshiko Shizime. She is dressed in body brands, uses cars and bikes, grenades and recoilless rifle and other weapons master. She was one of the reason Mamoru started his mission.

Soundtrack 

Staff
 Original: Yoshito Usui
 Director: Akira Shigino 
 Screenplay: Isao Shizuya 
 Storyboard: Akira Shigino and Noriyuki Nakamura
 Animation director: Katsunori Hara and Hideo Hariganeya
 Character Design: Katsunori Hara and Yuichiro Sueyoshi
 Cinematography: Toshiyuki Umeda
 Editor: Toshihiko Kojima
 Sound director: Akira Okuma
 Music: Kei Wakakusa, Toshiyuki Arakawa and Minoru Maruo
 Chief producer: Taisuke Wada, Noboru Sugiyama, Yoko Matsushita and Kazuki Nakashima
 Producer: Yuki Yoshida, Atsushi Kaji, Rika Tsuruzaki and Kensuke Suzuki
 Production: Shin-Ei Animation, TV Asahi, ADK and Futabasha

Box office
The film debuted on 323 cinema halls in Japan. It ranked as ninth highest-grossing anime film in Japan.

Here is a table which shows the box office of this movie of all the weekends in Japan:

Trivia
The phrase "The Storm Called! (arashi o yobu!)" is not used in this movie title. Possibly, the reason is Heptadecaphobia.

See also
 List of Crayon Shin-chan films

References

External links
 
 

2009 films
2009 anime films
Roar! Kasukabe Animal Kingdom
Toho animated films